Loch Buidhe is a freshwater loch in Sutherland, Highland council area, Scotland.
The name is Gaelic for yellow loch.

References

Buidhe
Buidhe
Landforms of Sutherland